Leuronotina is a genus of band-winged grasshoppers in the family Acrididae. There are at least four described species in Leuronotina.

Species
These four species belong to the genus Leuronotina:
 Leuronotina obesa Otte, 1984
 Leuronotina orizabae (Saussure, 1884)
 Leuronotina philorites Otte, 1984
 Leuronotina ritensis (Rehn, 1912) (lichen grasshopper)

References

Further reading

 
 

Oedipodinae
Articles created by Qbugbot